Aufhausen Priory, formerly the Aufhausen Oratory, is a Benedictine monastery located at Aufhausen near Regensburg in Bavaria, Germany. The original community, dedicated to Our Lady of the Snows, was founded in the late 17th century as an Oratorian community by the local priest, Johann Georg Seidenbusch. It was not dissolved during the secularisation of Bavaria in 1802–03, but remained under the title "Königliches Nerianerinstitut" (Royal Nerian Institute), at least until 1829. The last provost died in 1886.

It was re-settled in 1890 from the Benedictine abbey at Metten, and partly re-built.

References

External links

Monasteries in Bavaria
Benedictine monasteries in Germany
Oratorian communities
Christian monasteries established in the 17th century
17th-century establishments in the Holy Roman Empire
Buildings and structures in Regensburg (district)
17th-century churches in Germany